Maryland's Legislative District 31 is one of 47 districts in the state for the Maryland General Assembly. It covers part of Anne Arundel County. Up until the 2020 United States redistricting cycle, the district was divided into two sub-districts for the Maryland House of Delegates: District 31A and District 31B.

Demographic characteristics
As of the 2020 United States census, the district had a population of 140,611, of whom 109,551 (77.9%) were of voting age. The racial makeup of the district was 97,123 (69.1%) White, 20,581 (14.6%) African American, 606 (0.4%) Native American, 4,908 (3.5%) Asian, 64 (0.0%) Pacific Islander, 6,027 (4.3%) from some other race, and 11,262 (8.0%) from two or more races. Hispanic or Latino of any race were 11,689 (8.3%) of the population.

The district had 96,299 registered voters as of October 17, 2020, of whom 21,137 (21.9%) were registered as unaffiliated, 36,831 (38.2%) were registered as Republicans, 36,960 (38.4%) were registered as Democrats, and 677 (0.7%) were registered to other parties.

Political representation
The district is represented for the 2023–2027 legislative term in the State Senate by Bryan W. Simonaire (R) and in the House of Delegates by Rachel Muñoz (R), Brian A. Chisholm (R) and Nicholaus R. Kipke (R).

Election results

References

Anne Arundel County, Maryland
31